Allan Michaël Delferrière (born 3 March 2002) is a Belgian professional footballer who plays as a right-back for Hibernian.

Club career
Delferriere made his professional debut with Standard Liège in a 6–2 Belgian First Division A loss to Oostende on 1 May 2021, coming on as a late sub in the 68th minute.

On 23 July 2021, he joined MVV in the Netherlands on a season-long loan.

On 1 February 2022, Delferrière's loan deal at MVV came to an end in order for him to join Hibernian on a two-and-a-half year deal. He was loaned to Edinburgh in August 2022.

Career statistics

References

External links
 
 ACFF Profile

2002 births
Living people
Belgian footballers
Belgium youth international footballers
Association football defenders
Standard Liège players
MVV Maastricht players
Belgian Pro League players
Eerste Divisie players
Belgian expatriate footballers
Expatriate footballers in the Netherlands
Belgian expatriate sportspeople in the Netherlands
Scottish Professional Football League players
F.C. Edinburgh players